The president of Ichkeria, formally the president of the Chechen Republic of Ichkeria was the head of the Chechen Republic of Ichkeria from 1991 to 2007, the Islamic Republic that existed until the victory of the Russian Federation in the Second Chechen War.

This is a list of presidents of the unrecognised Chechen Republic of Ichkeria, a de facto state in Chechnya that controlled most of the former Checheno-Ingush ASSR from 1991 to 2007 (see First Chechen War, Second Chechen War). Ichkeria's last presidential elections were held in January 1997.

Presidents of Ichkeria

Generally recognized presidents-in-exile 

 Aslan Maskhadov (February 2000 – 8 March 2005)
 Abdul-Halim Sadulayev (acting, 8 March 2005 – 17 June 2006)
 Dokka Umarov (acting, 17 June 2006 – 31 October 2007)

Formation of the Caucasus Emirate and dispute
On 31 October 2007, the separatist news agency Chechenpress reported that Dokka Umarov, the president of Ichkeria, had proclaimed the Caucasus Emirate and declared himself its Emir, thereby abolishing the Chechen Republic of Ichkeria and its presidency. This move was denounced by parts of the Chechen exile movement. Akhmed Zakayev was subsequently appointed Prime Minister of the Chechen Republic of Ichkeria's government-in-exile.

Last election

See also
Politics of Chechnya
List of leaders of Communist Chechnya
Head of the Chechen Republic – list of leaders of Chechnya since 2003

References

Sources
 World Statesmen.org
 

Chechen Republic of Ichkeria
Heads of the Chechen Republic
Politics of Chechnya